Juli Mira (born 1949) is a Spanish actor. He appeared in more than eighty films since 1978.

Selected filmography

References

External links 

1949 births
Living people
Spanish male film actors